Ian Anderson (born 1947) is a British musician, best known as the leader of the rock band Jethro Tull.

Ian Anderson may also refer to:

Arts and entertainment
 Ian A. Anderson (born 1947), English folk musician and editor of fRoots magazine
 Ian M. Anderson (born 1985), American entrepreneur, founder of Afternoon Records
 Ian Lloyd Anderson (born 1987), Irish actor
 Ian R. Anderson, vocalist of UK bands Crazyhead and The Scavengers

Sports
 Ian Anderson (New Zealand cricketer) (1922–1977), New Zealand cricketer
 Ian Anderson (South African cricketer) (born 1935), South African cricketer
 Ian Anderson (snooker player) (born 1946), Australian snooker player
 Ian Anderson (Australian footballer) (born 1948), Australian rules footballer
 Ian Anderson (Scottish footballer) (1954–2008), Scottish football defender
 Ian Anderson (baseball) (born 1998), American baseball player

Others
 Ian Anderson (Manx politician) (1925–2005), Manx (Isle of Man) politician and former President of the Legislative Council
 Ian Anderson (British politician) (1953–2011), British National Front leader
 Ian Anderson (professor) (born 1965), Australian academic and senior public servant

See also
 Iain Anderson (disambiguation)
 Jan Anderson (disambiguation)